Barry Taylor may refer to:

 Barry Taylor (Auf Wiedersehen, Pet), a fictional character on the British television drama Auf Wiedersehen, Pet
 Barry Taylor (Barnsley F.C.), English football fan

See also
Taylor Barry (born 1995), New Zealand boxer